Nyasaka is an administrative ward in Ilemela District, Mwanza Region, Tanzania with a postcode number 33214. In the national census of 2002, the ward had a total population of 27,356. This was before the split from Nyamagana District on 1 October 2012, when Ilemela became a District Council with a total of 20 wards and in the National Census of 2012, the district had a population of 265,911.

References

Wards of Mwanza Region
Ilemela District
Constituencies of Tanzania